Zudausques is a commune in the Pas-de-Calais department in the Hauts-de-France region of France.

Geography
Zudausques includes the four hamlets of Adsoit, Cormette, Noircarme and Leuline, located 6 miles (9 km) west of Saint-Omer, at the D206 road junction with the D46.

Population

Places of interest
 The church of St.Omer, dating from the fifteenth century.
 The church of St. Folquin at Cornettes, dating from the seventeenth century.

See also
Communes of the Pas-de-Calais department

References

Communes of Pas-de-Calais